Baron Israël Karl-Gustav "K-G" Eugène Lagerfelt (21 November 1909 – 11 December 1986) was a Swedish diplomat.

Early life
Lagerfelt was born on 21 November 1909 in Jönköping, Sweden, the son of captain, baron Gustaf Adolf Lagerfelt and baroness Gertrud (née von Essen). He received a Candidate of Law degree in 1932 and a Bachelor of Arts in 1935 before becoming an attaché at the Ministry for Foreign Affairs in Stockholm in 1935.

Career
Lagerfelt served in Helsinki in 1936 and in London in 1938 as well as at the Foreign Ministry in Stockholm in 1938. He was second secretary in 1939 and first secretary at the Foreign Ministry in Stockholm in 1943. Lagerfelt was first secretary in London in 1943 and in Paris in 1947 as well as at the Foreign Ministry in Stockholm in 1948. He was director at the Foreign Ministry in Stockholm in 1950 (acting in 1948). Lagerfelt was diplomatic representative in Japan in 1951 and envoy in Tokyo from 1952 to 1956 during the time of the case of Sweden v. Yamaguchi.

He was then Permanent Representative to the High Authority of the European Coal and Steel Community in Luxembourg from 1956 to 1963, the Council of Europe from 1957 to 1963, the European Atomic Energy Community and the European Economic Community in Brussels from 1959 to 1963. Lagerfelt was ambassador in Vienna from 1964 to 1969 and in The Hague from 1969 to 1972. He was ambassador and head of Sweden's Permanent Delegation of the International Organizations in Geneva from 1972 to 1975 and was chairman of the council of the United Nations Conference on Trade and Development from 1976 to 1977. Lagerfelt was consultant at the Volvo International Development Corporation from 1978 to 1979 and was chairman of the parliamentary Inter-American Development Bank investigations from 1980 to 1982. He was also deputy counsel and expert in the United Nations General Assembly in 1967, 1976 and 1977.

Personal life
In 1947 Lagerfelt married Sara Champion de Crespigny (1914–1967), the daughter of the British major Vierville Champion de Crespigny and Nora (née McSloy). They divorced and in 1974 he married Monique Suetens (1932–2010), the daughter of the Belgian director Albert Suetens and Madeleine (née Limpens). Lagerfelt was the father of Caroline (born 1947) and Johan (born 1949).

Lagerfelt was the owner of the mansion Säbylund in Kumla Municipality until his son Johan Lagerfelt bought the property from his father in 1970.

Death
Lagerfelt died of 11 December 1986 and was buried at Kumla Cemetery in Kumla.

Awards and decorations

Swedish
   Knight of the Order of the Polar Star
  Knight of the Order of Saint John in Sweden

Foreign
   First Class of the Order of the Sacred Treasure
   Commander First Class of the Order of the Lion of Finland
   Commander of the Hungarian Order of Merit
   Knight First Class of the Order of the White Rose of Finland
   Knight of the Legion of Honour

Honours
Former Herald of Orders of His Majesty the King (Kungl. Maj:ts Orden).

Bibliography

References

External links
 List of GATT representatives

1909 births
1986 deaths
Barons of Sweden
Ambassadors of Sweden to Japan
Ambassadors of Sweden to Austria
Ambassadors of Sweden to the Netherlands
People from Jönköping
Knights of the Order of the Polar Star